Rhett Reese is an American film producer, television producer, and screenwriter. As a screenwriter, his early credits included Clifford's Really Big Movie and Cruel Intentions 3. He has collaborated with Paul Wernick, writing the films Zombieland, G.I. Joe: Retaliation, and Life, as well as Deadpool, Deadpool 2 and Deadpool 3. Together they also created the reality series The Joe Schmo Show.

Biography
Reese grew up in Phoenix, Arizona, and one of his high school friends was the brother of Paul Wernick. Years later, as a budding screenwriter, Reese met Wernick again as he worked as a television producer, and one of Wernick's jobs, Big Brother 2, inspired both to do their own take on reality shows, The Joe Schmo Show. 

Reese lives in Los Angeles with his wife, actress, writer and producer Chelsey Crisp.

Filmography
Film

Television

References

External links

 
 Podcast Interview with Rhett Reese at Scripts & Scribes

American male screenwriters
American television producers
American television writers
Living people
Skydance Media people
Place of birth missing (living people)
Year of birth missing (living people)
American male television writers